This is a list of the episodes appearing in the Zoids: Chaotic Century anime series. Guardian Force is the second season in the anime.

Season 1 (Chaotic Century)

Season 2 (Guardian Force)

Notes

References

1999 Japanese television seasons
2000 Japanese television seasons
Zoids
Zoids Chaotic Century